The Gorlos (Khalkha-Mongolian:Горлос/Gorlos) are a Southern Mongol subgroup in Qian Gorlos Mongol Autonomous County, China.

See also 
 Gorlos (redirect page)
 Demographics of China
 List of medieval Mongolian tribes and clans

Mongols
Southern Mongols
Darlikin Mongols